Stranger's House is a 2019 Burmese thriller film starring Lwin Moe, Htun Eaindra Bo and Phway Phway. The film produced and distributed by Good Old Days Production premiered in Myanmar on August 1, 2019.

Synopsis
Nway Oo and Kay Thi, who live in Mandalay, arrived at their friend Mya's house while visiting Rangoon. At first it was seen as a happy house, but later it became scary and realized that it was a mental house. But then it was too late.

Cast
Lwin Moe as U Nay Aung
Htun Eaindra Bo as Daw Yin Yin, wife of U Nay Aung
Phway Phway as Nway Oo
Ku Ku Zin Aung as Mya, daughter of U Nay Aung
Myat Noe Aye as Kay Thi
Charli as Myo Thit
Lin Zarni Zaw as Daw Wai Wai
Shein Tin Htoo as Shein
Joker as The Neighbor

References

External links

2019 films
2010s Burmese-language films
Burmese thriller films
Films shot in Myanmar
2019 thriller films